The Middle Powers Initiative (MPI), a program of the Global Security Institute, is dedicated to the worldwide reduction and elimination of nuclear weapons, in a series of well-defined stages accompanied by increasing verification and control.

Through MPI, eight international non-governmental organizations are able to work primarily with "middle power" governments to encourage and educate the nuclear weapons states to take immediate practical steps that reduce nuclear dangers, and commence negotiations to eliminate nuclear weapons.

Middle power countries are politically and economically significant, internationally respected countries that have renounced the nuclear arms race, a standing that gives them significant political credibility.

The campaign is guided by an International Steering Committee, chaired by Senator Douglas Roche, O.C., former Canadian Disarmament Ambassador.

Currently, the efforts of the Middle Powers Initiative are focused through the Article VI Forum, a new and creative initiative intended to stimulate and shape effective responses to the crisis of the non-proliferation / disarmament regime manifested by the breakdown of the 2005 NPT Review Conference. The Article VI Forum takes its name from the article of the NPT in which the nuclear states commit themselves to the elimination of their nuclear weapons.

The Forum is conducting high-level meetings with key diplomats and leaders to examine the political, legal, and technical elements required for a nuclear weapons-free world.

The Forum will continue its work of advancing the imperative to uphold the core bargain of the Nuclear Non-Proliferation Treaty relating to the proliferation of nuclear weapons and ensuring steady progress toward their global elimination.

External links
 Middle Powers Initiative

International security